Cleburne Jersey Farm is a historic farmhouse in Spring Hill, Tennessee, USA.

History
The two-storey house was completed in 1872. It was built McCoy Campbell. It was named "Cleburne" in honor of General Patrick Cleburne, who served in the Confederate States Army during the American Civil War.

It was the second Jersey cattle farm in the United States.

Architectural significance
The house has been listed on the National Register of Historic Places since November 22, 2000.

References

Houses on the National Register of Historic Places in Tennessee
Italianate architecture in Tennessee
Houses completed in 1872
Houses in Maury County, Tennessee
Farms on the National Register of Historic Places in Tennessee
National Register of Historic Places in Maury County, Tennessee
Historic districts on the National Register of Historic Places in Tennessee